HGB stands for:

 Hamilton, Grimsby and Beamsville Electric Railway, or HG&B, a defunct Canadian interurban railway company
 Handelsgesetzbuch, the German Commercial Code
 Hellogoodbye, an American power pop band
 Hemoglobin
 Himalayan Geothermal Belt
 Hochschule für Grafik und Buchkunst Leipzig